Sergei Nikolayevich Burchenkov (born 24 July 1977) is a Russian former professional footballer.

Club career
Burchenkov made his debut in the Russian Premier League in 1996 for FC Torpedo-Luzhniki Moscow.

Honours
 Russian Premier League bronze: 2000.

European competition history
 UEFA Cup 1996–97 with FC Torpedo-Luzhniki Moscow: 3 games.
 UEFA Intertoto Cup 1997 with FC Torpedo-Luzhniki Moscow: 5 games.

References

1977 births
Footballers from Moscow
Living people
Russian footballers
Russia under-21 international footballers
Association football defenders
FC Torpedo Moscow players
FC Torpedo-2 players
FC Elista players
Russian Premier League players
FC Oryol players
FC Avangard Kursk players
FC Torpedo Vladimir players